Crassispira harfordiana is a species of sea snail, a marine gastropod mollusk in the family Pseudomelatomidae.

Description
The length of the shell varies between 30 mm and 40 mm.

The whorls show a narrow yellowish band on the periphery.

Distribution
This marine species occurs off Cuba and Panama.

References

External links
 Biolib.cz: Crassispira harfordiana
 
 
 McLean, J.H. (1971) A revised classification of the family Turridae, with the proposal of new subfamilies, genera, and subgenera from the Eastern Pacific. The Veliger, 14, 114–130

harfordiana
Gastropods described in 1843